The 2012 Donegal Senior Football Championship was contested by senior Gaelic football clubs under the auspices of Donegal GAA.

Format
There was a preliminary round. The first round involved eight two-legged ties played home and away. The eight winning teams progressed to the quarter-finals from which the four winning teams progressed to the semifinals from which the two winning teams progressed to the final.

The 2012 Senior Championship finished later than usual, postponed due to the Donegal senior inter-county team's involvement in the 2012 All-Ireland Senior Football Championship Final, which they won on 23 September 2012. The 2012 Senior Championship got back underway a week later. With interest in Gaelic football at an all-time high after the 2012 All-Ireland Senior Football Championship Final, the Senior County Final was broadcast live nationwide on TG4.

Draw
The draw for the first round (as well as a preliminary round) was made at the RTÉ Raidió na Gaeltachta studios in Derrybeg.

Bracket

Results

Preliminary round

First round

First leg

Second leg

Play off/ extra time

Quarter-finals

Quarter-final replay

Semi-finals

Final
St Eunan's defeated Naomh Conaill in the final, held at MacCumhaill Park in Ballybofey on 4 November 2012. The decisive goal in the final was scored by young Lee McMonagle in the 50th minute of the game, following a layoff from full-forward Ross Wherity, who received the ball via a long pass from Rory Kavanagh. The teams were level on many occasions until Mark McGowan scored the winning point in freak circumstances. Brendan McDyre of opponents Naomh Conaill attempted to backpass to his goalkeeper Stephen McGrath only for the ball to drift out for a '45'. McGowan stepped up to punish. As the game ended he was photographed celebrating—stooped, wild-eyed with open mouth, sweat-soaked, bare thighs tensed, veins throbbing, mud-stained legs apart and clenched fists turned upwards. As Donegal Champions, Eunan's progressed to the Ulster quarter-final the following week, where they were defeated by Crossmaglen Rangers at Armagh's Athletic Grounds.

References

External links
 Minute-by-minute progression of final on TheScore.ie

Donegal Senior Football Championship
Donegal Senior Football Championship